Eat: The Story of Food is a six-part American documentary television series which aired on the National Geographic Channel from November 21 to 23, 2014.

The show talked to nearly 70 people discussing the origins, history, science and culture of food. Celebrity chefs such as Nigella Lawson, Rachael Ray and Padma Lakshmi were among those taking part in the series.

Episodes 
The series consisted of six episodes, with two premiering each night across three consecutive nights. Two special episodes premiered on 12/20/15.

References

External links 

 

2010s American documentary television series
2014 American television series debuts
English-language television shows
National Geographic (American TV channel) original programming